Charles Edward Kenneth Mees FRS (26 May 1882 – 15 August 1960) was a British scientist and photographic researcher.

Early life and education
Mees was born in Wellingborough, England, the son of a Wesleyan minister.

He attended the University of London. In 1906 he was awarded his D.Sc. with a dissertation on photographic theory.

Career
From 1906 until 1912, Mees worked for Wratten and Wainwright, Ltd., assisting Frederick Wratten in developing the first panchromatic photographic plates, as well as light filters and safelights for the darkroom.

In 1912, Eastman Kodak Company acquired Wratten and Wainwright because they were interested in the skills Mees provided. George Eastman convinced Mees to move to Rochester, New York, United States, where Mees created the Kodak Research Laboratories, becoming its first director.

Mees helped the US military in World War I in its instruction of photography. After the attack on Pearl Harbor, Mees became an American citizen so that he could have access to high security war projects and information during World War II.

Later, he was named vice president in charge of Research and Development for Eastman Kodak; he remained at that position until he retired in 1955.

During his career, he published 100 scientific papers and 60 other works. Among his accomplishments was the development of sensitive photographic emulsions for use in astronomy.

Mees served as the first president of the board of trustees of George Eastman House from 1947 until 1954.

He died suddenly in Honolulu in 1960.

Personal life
He married in 1909 Alice Crisp, and together they raised two children: Graham (1910) and Doris (1912). They were married for 45 years.

In 1951 he suffered a massive thrombosis in one leg and lost it to amputation. Despite that, he became adept at using an artificial limb and even managed to drive his own car.

Selected works
 C.E. Kenneth Mees, An Atlas of Absorption Spectra, 1909.
 C.E. Kenneth Mees, The Photography of Colored Objects, 1909.
 C.E. Kenneth Mees, F. M. Hamer and L. G. S. Brooker. Recent advances in sensitizers for the photography of the infrared. J. Opt. Soc. Am., 23:216., 1933
C.E. Kenneth Mees, Photography, Macmillan Co., New York, 1942.
 C.E. Kenneth Mees, The Theory of the Photographic Process, Macmillan Co., New York, 1942.
 C.E. Kenneth Mees & S. Sheppard, Investigations on the Theory of the Photographic Process.
 C.E. Kenneth Mees, The Path of Science, J. Wiley & sons, inc., 1946.
 C.E. Kenneth Mees and John A. Leermakers, The Organization of Industrial Scientific Research, McGraw-Hill, 1950.
 C.E. Kenneth Mees, From dry plates to Ektachrome film: a story of photographic research, Ziff-Davis Pub. Co., 1961.

Awards and honors
 Progress Medal, Royal Photographic Society, Great Britain, 1912 and 1952
 Hurter and Driffield Medal, 1924
 Henry Draper Medal, National Academy of Sciences, 1936.
 Progress Medal, Society of Motion Picture and Television Engineers, 1936
 Franklin Medal, 1954
 Fellow of the Royal Photographic Society
 Fellow of the Royal Society, 1939
 Inductee, International Photography Hall of Fame, 1972

Legacy
 The C.E.K. Mees Award is the highest research honor given by Kodak. 
 The C.E.K. Mees Medal, awarded in odd-numbered years by the Optical Society of America, is named after him and was endowed by the Mees family.
 The University of Rochester's C.E.K. Mees Observatory is named after him.
 The crater Mees on the Moon is named after him.
 Mees Solar Observatory on the summit of Haleakala is named after him.

References

Further reading

External links
 Dr. C.E. Kenneth Mees (1882–1960) at iphf.org
 Historically speaking - tribute to C.E. Kenneth Mees, scientist and photographer, and former VP at Eastman Kodak
 Charles Edward Kenneth Mees 1882-1960 Mees' role in history of infrared photography development and Kodachrome
National Academy of Sciences Biographical Memoir

1882 births
1960 deaths
British physicists
Color scientists
People from Wellingborough
Fellows of the Royal Society
George Eastman House people
Kodak people